The Meath Senior Hurling Championship is an annual Gaelic Athletic Association competition organised by Meath GAA among the top hurling clubs in County Meath, Ireland. The winner qualifies to represent the county in the Leinster Intermediate Club Hurling Championship, the winner of which progresses to the All-Ireland Intermediate Club Hurling Championship.

The first senior hurling championship was held in 1902 and Navan Hibernians finished as the inaugural winning team. In 2008, Kilmessan became the first Meath club to win a Leinster hurling club championship, when they won the Intermediate title.

Top winners

Roll of honour

 Note: 2020 final was played on 8 August 2021 as final was delayed due to the impact of the COVID-19 pandemic on Gaelic games.

See also
 Meath Senior Football Championship

References

External links
Official Meath Website
Meath on Hoganstand
Meath Club GAA
Navan O'Mahonys - Navan Hurling.com

Hurling competitions in Leinster
Meath GAA club championships
Senior hurling county championships